The 2003 Asian Basketball Confederation Championship for Men was the qualifying tournament for the Basketball Tournament at the 2004 Summer Olympics in Athens, Greece. The tournament was held in Harbin, China from September 23 to October 1, 2003.

Qualification

According to the ABC rules, each zone had two places, and the hosts (China) and the best 5 teams of the previous Asian Championship were automatically qualified.

Draw

Preliminary round

Group A

Group B

Group C

Group D

Quarterfinal round

Group I

Group II

Group III

Group IV

Classification 5th–16th

15th place

13th place

11th place

9th place

7th place

5th place

Final round

Semifinals

3rd place

Final

Final standing

Awards

References

External links
 Results
 archive.fiba.com
 jabba-net.com

ABC
2003
B
Bask
September 2003 sports events in China
October 2003 sports events in Asia